Dorcadion rolandmenradi is a species of beetle in the family Cerambycidae. It was described by Peks in 1992. It is known from Turkey.

References

rolandmenradi
Beetles described in 1992